Barangol (Baraan-Kool) is a rural locality (a selo) in Ust-Muninskoye Rural Settlement of Mayminsky District, the Altai Republic, Russia. The population was 115 as of 2016. There are 5 streets.

Geography 
Barangol is located on the Katun River, 52 km south of Mayma (the district's administrative centre) by road. Verkh Barangol is the nearest rural locality.

References 

Rural localities in Mayminsky District